Grimace (also Grymace, Grimache or Magister Grimache) was a French composer-poet in the  style of late medieval music. Virtually nothing is known about Grimace's life other than speculative information based on the circumstances and content of his five surviving compositions of formes fixes; three ballades, a virelai and rondeau. He is thought to have been a younger contemporary of Guillaume de Machaut and based in southern France. Three of his works were included in the Chantilly Codex, which is an important source of  music. However, along with P. des Molins, Jehan Vaillant and F. Andrieu, Grimace was one of the post-Machaut generation whose music shows few distinctly  features, leading scholars to recognize Grimace's work as closer to the  style of Machaut. His best known and most often performed work in modern-times is the virelai and proto-battaglia: A l’arme A l’arme.

Identity and career
Almost nothing is known about Grimace's life other than the authorship of five works: three ballades, a virelai and rondeau, all of which are formes fixes. Grimace's identity remains unknown and his mononymous name is a likely a sobriquet, similar to other composers of his time such as Zacar, Trebor, and possibly also Solage. His name is recorded in medieval manuscript sources with multiple variants, including Grimace, Grymace, Grimache and Magister Grimache. Grimace is thought to be French or to have been active in the courts of southern France, since two of his ballades, Des que buisson and Se Zephirus/Se Jupiter (a double ballade), and the virelai A l’arme A l’arme are included in the Chantilly Codex, a 14th century manuscript containing almost exclusively secular music by French composers. Similarities to the music of Guillaume de Machaut ( – 1377), the most significant composer of the 14th century, suggests they are contemporaries. The strongest resemblance is found in Machaut's works from the 1360s and 70s, furthering that Grimace was a younger contemporary of Machaut, who flourished in the mid-to-late 14th century. Musicologist Gilbert Reaney speculated that Se Zephirus/Se Jupiter might have been written for Gaston III, Count of Foix and John I of Aragon.

Music

Overview

The Chantilly Codex is a primary source of ars subtilior music; however, Grimace's works have been noted as lacking the complicated rhythms that characterize the style, without variations in the value of the shortest note and rarely using syncopated rhythms. His poetry and music, especially his ballades, bear a closer resemblance to that of Machaut, an ars nova composer. Despite their parallels, Reaney notes that Grimace's contributions to the Chantilly Codex are more advanced than those of Machaut. Nevertheless, with P. des Molins, Jehan Vaillant, and F. Andrieu, Grimace was one of the "post-Machaut" generation whose pieces retain enough  qualities to be separable from those of the rhythmically-complex  composers such as Johannes Cuvelier and Johannes Susay. Musicologist  cites Grimace specifically as a transitional figure from the "Machaut-style" to the "Post-Machaut" style; both before . This especially included the continuation of the ballade in the same general structure and style of Machaut.

In both of Grimace's four part works, A l’arme A l’arme and Des que buisson, each upper part builds a contrapuntal relationship off the lowest part (tenor), while the tenor itself exchanges this role with the second lowest part (contratenor), usually when the latter goes below the tenor. This happens often since the contratenor is usually lower, except at important section endings, similar to late works by Machaut such as Phyton (B39), although as B39 is in three parts, the lower contratenor does not, there, take on any contrapuntal foundation.

Ballades

The two part ballade Dedens mon cuer survives, but is incomplete, and shares an identical refrain text with Trebor's ballade Passerose de beaute. Musicologist Yolanda Plumley notes that Dedens mon cuer also has textual similarities to other "Machaut-style" ballades: Egidius's Roses et lis ay veu en une fleur and the anonymous En mon cuer est un blanc cine pourtrait.

One of two surviving four part works, the ballade Des que buisson is notable for its use of hocket in the triplum (third part) which Günther describes as something that "is striking and contributes to the complementary rhythm of the piece". Since Des que buisson means to represent the coming of spring, musicologist Elizabeth Eva Leach explains the hocket rhythms, as well as falling thirds and repeated notes, as part of a birdsong motif.

In Grimace's double ballade Se Zephirus/Se Jupiter, similarities to Machaut are especially apparent since Grimace adopts musical rhymes at the main cadences. The work has the same rhymes as Machaut's double ballade Quant Theseus/Ne quier (B34), with which it also shares a refrain text. Despite this, Leach notes that Quant Theseus/Ne quier is in four parts with two texted upper voices and an untexted contratenor, as opposed to the three-part Se Zephirus/Se Jupiter where only the tenor is untexted. Because of this, closer technical similarities can be drawn to the polytextual double ballade Je me merveil/J’ay pluseurs fois by Jacob Senleches, and Jehan Vaillant’s double rondeau Dame, doucement/Doulz amis. Both texts of Se Zephirus/Se Jupiter have an Ubi sunt theme, which is when, as Leach describes it, "hyperbolical comparisons are made between the lady and/or patron and a list of figures from the classical, biblical and/or Christian past". Other works in the Chantilly Codex are representative of this, often signified by also beginning the text with "Se". Se Zephirus/Se Jupiter is Grimace's second most frequently performed work.

Virelai

Grimace's most frequently performed and best known composition is his other four part work, the virelai A l’arme A l’arme, which musicologist Ursula Günther describes as "unique and extremely interesting", and musicologist Willi Apel characterizes as anticipating the later battaglia form. Musicologist Jeremy Yudkin expands on this, noting the many battle-cry and fanfare-like phrases representing warfare; something that was commonplace in 14th century France. The work is for four parts – two cantus parts, a contratenor, and a tenor – and the cantus voices share text, while the contratenor and tenor parts imitate the upper voices despite being un-texted. At the same time, the contratenor and tenor have their own syncopation and rhythmic interplay with each other. Yudkin notes that the work's second section has a more "chordal texture", leading to a half cadence in the first ending.

Rondeau
Grimace's rondeau for three parts, Je voy ennui, survived in manuscript 222 C. 22 in the Bibliothèque municipale of Strasbourg until 1870/1, when it was destroyed during the Franco-Prussian war. The music is now known only in a  transcription of this source by musicologist Edmond de Coussemaker; it is preserved in Brussels, Bibliothèque du Conservatoire Royal de Musique, MS 56286. Je voy ennui has less directional counterpoint than his other works, potentially due to errors in the transcription that are now uncheckable.

Doubtful works
Apel proposed that two virelais – C’estoit ma douce and Rescoés: Horrible feu d’ardent desir/Rescoés: Le feu de mon loyal servant – are by Grimace based on stylistic similarities, the latter of which shows considerable textual and musical similarities to A l’arme A l’arme. Their attribution remains doubtful.

Works

Editions
Grimace's works are included in the following collections:

References

Notes

References

Sources
Books

 
 
 
 
 
 
 

Journals and articles

 
  
  
 
 
 

Online

Blog by subject-matter expert

Further reading

 
 
 
  Reprinted in Wilkins, Nigel E. (2011). "Words and Music in Medieval Europe". Farnham: Ashgate. 8: 40–84.

External links

 
 Works by Grimace in the Medieval Music Database from La Trobe University

French classical composers
French male classical composers
14th-century French composers
Medieval male composers
14th-century French poets
Ars nova composers
Year of birth unknown
Year of death unknown